Simone Grotzkyj Giorgi (born 28 September 1988 in Pesaro) is an Italian motorcycle racer. He was the CIV 125 GP champion in 2005.

Career statistics

Grand Prix motorcycle racing

By season

Races by year
(key)

References

External links

1988 births
Living people
Italian motorcycle racers
125cc World Championship riders
250cc World Championship riders
Moto3 World Championship riders
People from Pesaro
FIM Superstock 1000 Cup riders
Sportspeople from the Province of Pesaro and Urbino